Ross Nicholson (born 8 August 1975 in Gisborne, New Zealand) is an association football goalkeeper who represented New Zealand at international level.

International career
Nicholson made his full All Whites debut as a substitute in an 8–1 win over Vanuatu at the Oceania Nations Cup in Australia on 28 September 1998. He was included in the New Zealand squad for the 1999 Confederations Cup finals tournament in Mexico where he was an unused substitute, and was first choice goalkeeper for Auckland City FC at the 2006 FIFA Club World Cup in Japan.

Nicholson ended his international playing career with 14 A-international caps to his credit, his final cap being in a 0–0 draw with Estonia on 31 May 2006.

Honours

Club
Central United FC
New Zealand National Soccer League: 1999, 2001
Chatham Cup: 1997, 1998, 2005

Auckland City FC
New Zealand Football Championship: 2005/06, 2006/07, 2008/09
FIFA Club World Cup: 2006

New Zealand All Whites Under 19 National Team
6 Appearances: 1992

New Zealand All Whites National Team
14 Appearances: 1998 to 2006
Merdeka Tournament Cup Winners: 2000
FIFA Conferations Cup - Mexico: 1999

References

External links
 

1975 births
Living people
Sportspeople from Gisborne, New Zealand
Association football goalkeepers
New Zealand association footballers
New Zealand international footballers
Auckland City FC players
Football Kingz F.C. players
Central United F.C. players
National Soccer League (Australia) players
New Zealand Football Championship players
1998 OFC Nations Cup players
1999 FIFA Confederations Cup players
2000 OFC Nations Cup players